Arjunpur is a village in Bakshi Ka Talab block of Lucknow district, Uttar Pradesh, India. As of 2011, its population is 1,089, in 193 households. It is part of the gram panchayat of Chak Prithvipur.

References 

Villages in Lucknow district